The Roman Catholic Diocese of Abengourou is a diocese located in the city of Abengourou in the Ecclesiastical province of Bouaké in Côte d'Ivoire.

History
 September 13, 1963: Established as Diocese of Abengourou from the Metropolitan Archdiocese of Abidjan, Diocese of Bouaké and Diocese of Katiola

Special churches
The Cathedral is the Cathédrale Sainte Thérèse de l’enfant Jésus in Abengourou.

Leadership, in reverse chronogical order
 Bishops of Abengourou (Roman rite), below
 Bishop Gbaya Boniface Ziri (since 2009.07.01)
 Bishop Jean-Jacques Koffi Oi Koffi (2003.11.21 - 2009.01.03), appointed Bishop of San Pedro-en-Côte d'Ivoire
 Bishop Bruno Kouamé (1981.03.26 – 2003.11.21)
 Bishop Laurent Yapi (1979.01.12 – 1980.08.17)
 Bishop Eugène Abissa Kwaku (1963.09.13 – 1978.08.10)

See also
Roman Catholicism in Côte d'Ivoire
 List of Roman Catholic dioceses in Côte d'Ivoire

Sources
 GCatholic.org
 Catholic Hierarchy

Abengourou
Christian organizations established in 1963
Roman Catholic dioceses and prelatures established in the 20th century
Abengourou
Indénié-Djuablin
1963 establishments in Ivory Coast
Roman Catholic Ecclesiastical Province of Bouaké